The 3rd constituency of Aisne is a French legislative constituency in the Aisne département.

Description

Aisne's 3rd constituency covers the north east portion of the department.

The seat has been continuously controlled by the Socialist Party and its predecessor the SFIO since 1967.

Historic Representation

Election results

2022

2017

2012

|- style="background-color:#E9E9E9;text-align:center;"
! colspan="2" rowspan="2" style="text-align:left;" | Candidate
! rowspan="2" colspan="2" style="text-align:left;" | Party
! colspan="2" | 1st round
! colspan="2" | 2nd round
|- style="background-color:#E9E9E9;text-align:center;"
! width="75" | Votes
! width="30" | %
! width="75" | Votes
! width="30" | %
|-
| style="background-color:" |
| style="text-align:left;" | Jean-Louis Bricout
| style="text-align:left;" | Socialist Party
| PS
| 
| 41.10%
| 
| 54.31%
|-
| style="background-color:" |
| style="text-align:left;" | Frédéric Meura
| style="text-align:left;" | Union for a Popular Movement
| UMP
| 
| 32.04%
| 
| 45.69%
|-
| style="background-color:" |
| style="text-align:left;" | Bertrant Dutheil de la Rochere
| style="text-align:left;" | National Front
| FN
| 
| 16.30%
| colspan="2" style="text-align:left;" |
|-
| style="background-color:" |
| style="text-align:left;" | Régis Lecoyer
| style="text-align:left;" | Left Front
| FG
| 
| 4.65%
| colspan="2" style="text-align:left;" |
|-
| style="background-color:" |
| style="text-align:left;" | Pierre Chabot
| style="text-align:left;" | Far Right
| EXD
| 
| 1.53%
| colspan="2" style="text-align:left;" |
|-
| style="background-color:" |
| style="text-align:left;" | France Savelli
| style="text-align:left;" | Radical Party
| PRV
| 
| 1.32%
| colspan="2" style="text-align:left;" |
|-
| style="background-color:" |
| style="text-align:left;" | Jean-Pierre Vitu
| style="text-align:left;" | Far Left
| EXG
| 
| 0.93%
| colspan="2" style="text-align:left;" |
|-
| style="background-color:" |
| style="text-align:left;" | Didier Colpin
| style="text-align:left;" | Miscellaneous Right
| DVD
| 
| 0.87%
| colspan="2" style="text-align:left;" |
|-
| style="background-color:" |
| style="text-align:left;" | Jean-Claude Pagniez
| style="text-align:left;" | Miscellaneous Right
| DVD
| 
| 0.81%
| colspan="2" style="text-align:left;" |
|-
| style="background-color:" |
| style="text-align:left;" | Joël Pichonnier
| style="text-align:left;" | Miscellaneous Left
| DVG
| 
| 0.46%
| colspan="2" style="text-align:left;" |
|-
| colspan="8" style="background-color:#E9E9E9;"|
|- style="font-weight:bold"
| colspan="4" style="text-align:left;" | Total
| 
| 100%
| 
| 100%
|-
| colspan="8" style="background-color:#E9E9E9;"|
|-
| colspan="4" style="text-align:left;" | Registered voters
| 
| style="background-color:#E9E9E9;"|
| 
| style="background-color:#E9E9E9;"|
|-
| colspan="4" style="text-align:left;" | Blank/Void ballots
| 
| 1.91%
| 
| 3.29%
|-
| colspan="4" style="text-align:left;" | Turnout
| 
| 58.87%
| 
| 58.92%
|-
| colspan="4" style="text-align:left;" | Abstentions
| 
| 41.13%
| 
| 41.08%
|-
| colspan="8" style="background-color:#E9E9E9;"|
|- style="font-weight:bold"
| colspan="6" style="text-align:left;" | Result
| colspan="2" style="background-color:" | PS HOLD
|}

2007

|- style="background-color:#E9E9E9;text-align:center;"
! colspan="2" rowspan="2" style="text-align:left;" | Candidate
! rowspan="2" colspan="2" style="text-align:left;" | Party
! colspan="2" | 1st round
! colspan="2" | 2nd round
|- style="background-color:#E9E9E9;text-align:center;"
! width="75" | Votes
! width="30" | %
! width="75" | Votes
! width="30" | %
|-
| style="background-color:" |
| style="text-align:left;" | Jean-Pierre Balligand
| style="text-align:left;" | Socialist Party
| PS
| 
| 41.16%
| 
| 53.31%
|-
| style="background-color:" |
| style="text-align:left;" | Frédéric Meura
| style="text-align:left;" | Union for a Popular Movement
| UMP
| 
| 36.24%
| 
| 46.69%
|-
| style="background-color:" |
| style="text-align:left;" | Nathalie Fauvergue
| style="text-align:left;" | National Front
| FN
| 
| 7.48%
| colspan="2" style="text-align:left;" |
|-
| style="background-color:" |
| style="text-align:left;" | Ginette Devaux
| style="text-align:left;" | Communist
| COM
| 
| 3.59%
| colspan="2" style="text-align:left;" |
|-
| style="background-color:" |
| style="text-align:left;" | Edwin Legris
| style="text-align:left;" | Democratic Movement
| MoDem
| 
| 3.42%
| colspan="2" style="text-align:left;" |
|-
| style="background-color:" |
| style="text-align:left;" | Dimitri Severac
| style="text-align:left;" | Far Left
| EXG
| 
| 2.16%
| colspan="2" style="text-align:left;" |
|-
| style="background-color:" |
| style="text-align:left;" | Valérie Delattre
| style="text-align:left;" | The Greens
| VEC
| 
| 1.41%
| colspan="2" style="text-align:left;" |
|-
| style="background-color:" |
| style="text-align:left;" | Andrée Flamengt
| style="text-align:left;" | Hunting, Fishing, Nature, Traditions
| CPNT
| 
| 1.16%
| colspan="2" style="text-align:left;" |
|-
| style="background-color:" |
| style="text-align:left;" | Marc Pailler
| style="text-align:left;" | Far Left
| EXG
| 
| 1.07%
| colspan="2" style="text-align:left;" |
|-
| style="background-color:" |
| style="text-align:left;" | Véronique Ballot
| style="text-align:left;" | Movement for France
| MPF
| 
| 0.99%
| colspan="2" style="text-align:left;" |
|-
| style="background-color:" |
| style="text-align:left;" | Raymonde Remy
| style="text-align:left;" | Far Right
| EXD
| 
| 0.53%
| colspan="2" style="text-align:left;" |
|-
| style="background-color:" |
| style="text-align:left;" | Isabelle Maillet
| style="text-align:left;" | Ecologist
| ECO
| 
| 0.49%
| colspan="2" style="text-align:left;" |
|-
| style="background-color:" |
| style="text-align:left;" | Monique Choain
| style="text-align:left;" | Divers
| DIV
| 
| 0.31%
| colspan="2" style="text-align:left;" |
|-
| colspan="8" style="background-color:#E9E9E9;"|
|- style="font-weight:bold"
| colspan="4" style="text-align:left;" | Total
| 
| 100%
| 
| 100%
|-
| colspan="8" style="background-color:#E9E9E9;"|
|-
| colspan="4" style="text-align:left;" | Registered voters
| 
| style="background-color:#E9E9E9;"|
| 
| style="background-color:#E9E9E9;"|
|-
| colspan="4" style="text-align:left;" | Blank/Void ballots
| 
| 2.01%
| 
| 2.67%
|-
| colspan="4" style="text-align:left;" | Turnout
| 
| 61.94%
| 
| 65.06%
|-
| colspan="4" style="text-align:left;" | Abstentions
| 
| 38.06%
| 
| 34.94%
|-
| colspan="8" style="background-color:#E9E9E9;"|
|- style="font-weight:bold"
| colspan="6" style="text-align:left;" | Result
| colspan="2" style="background-color:" | PS HOLD
|}

Sources
 Official results of French elections from 1998:

References

3